There have been three baronetcies created for persons with the surname Newman, one in the Baronetage of England and two in the Baronetage of the United Kingdom. Two of the creations are extant as of 2007.

Newman baronets of Fifehead-Magdalen (1699 – 1747)
The Newman Baronetcy of Fifehead-Magdalen in the County of Devon was created in the Baronetage of England on 20 December 1699 for Richard Newman (–1721). He later represented Milborne Port in the House of Commons.

Sir Samwell Newman, 2nd Baronet (–1747) was High Sheriff of Northamptonshire in 1746 . The title became extinct on his death in 1747.

Newman baronets of Stokeley and Mamhead (1836–)

The Newman Baronetcy of Stokeley and Mamhead in the County of Devon was created in the Baronetage of the United Kingdom on 17 March 1836 for Robert Newman (1776–1848), Member of Parliament for Exeter from 1818 until 1826 and High Sheriff of Devon in 1827.

Sir Robert Lydston Newman, 2nd Baronet (1821–1854) was killed in action at the Battle of Inkerman in the Crimean War.

Sir Lydston Newman, 3rd Baronet (1823–1892) was High Sheriff of Devon in 1871. The fourth Baronet represented Exeter in the House of Commons from 1918 to 1931. The latter year he was created Baron Mamhead, of Exeter in the County of Devon, in the Peerage of the United Kingdom. The peerage became extinct on his death in 1945 while the baronetcy is still extant.

Sir Sir Robert Hunt Stapylton Dudley Lydston Newman, 4th Baronet (1871–1945) was created Baron Mamhead in 1931.

Sir Ralph Alured Newman, 5th Baronet (1902–1968) reverted to the original baronetcy.

Sir Geoffrey Robert Newman, 6th Baronet (born 1947) is the current holder of the baronetcy.

Arms: Sable, three demi-lions rampant argent langued gules.

  Sir Robert William Newman, 1st Baronet (1776—1848)
  Sir Robert Lydston Newman, 2nd Baronet (1822—1854)
  Sir Lydston Newman, 3rd Baronet (1823—1892)
  Robert Hunt Stapylton Dudley Lydston Newman, 1st and last Baron Mamhead, 4th Baronet (1871—1945)
 Thomas Holdsworth Newman (1825—1894)
 Robert Lydston Newman (1865—1937)
  Sir Ralph Alured Newman, 5th Baronet (1902—1968)
  Sir Geoffrey Robert Newman, 6th Baronet (1947—)
 (1) Robert Melvil Newman (1985—)
 (2) Richard Claude Newman (1951–)
 (3) Henry Ralph Gordon Newman (1997—)
 (4) Jeremy Robert Lydston Newman (1999—)
 (5) Crispin George Latimer Newman (2002—)
 Thomas Lydston Newman (1906—1980)
 (6) Peter Thomas Lydston Newman (1944—)
 (7) Rubert Thomas Lydston Newman (1984—)
 (8) William Alistair Newman (1988—)
 Ralph Denne Newman (1871—1896)
 Lionel Ernest Newman (1875—1902)
 Alured Newman (1831—1904)
 Edward Devon Newman (1885—1977)
 John Edward Alured Newman (1915—)

The heir apparent is the present holder's son, Robert Melvil Newman (born 1985).

The heir apparent's heir presumptive is the present holder's brother, Richard Claude Newman (born 1951).

Neumann (later Newman) baronets of Cecil Lodge (1912)
The Neumann (later Newman) Baronetcy of Cecil Lodge in Newmarket in the County of Cambridge was created in the Baronetage of the United Kingdom on 6 February 1912 for Sigismund Neumann (1857–1916). He was a partner in the firms of S. Neumann and Co., merchants, and Neumann, Luebeck and Co., bankers. The family name was later anglicised to Newman. Neumann was the son of Gustav Neumann of Fürth, Bavaria.

Sir Cecil Gustavus Jacques Newman, 2nd Baronet (1891–1955) assumed by Royal licence the surname of Newman in lieu of Neumann in 1936. He was born brought up for the most part at Raynham Hall in Norfolk and 146 Piccadilly, his parents' London house. He was educated at Eton College and went to Balliol College, Oxford. In 1911 he was commissioned into the 1st Norfolk Yeomanry and served until 1920. He saw action at Gallipoli and was invalided out of the theatre with amoebic dysentery. He served as a staff Captain 1917–1920. He married Joan Grimston and bought Burloes Hall near Royston, Hertfordshire in 1923. He was a JP, County Councillor and Chairman of the town council for 10 years. He was High Sheriff of Hertfordshire in 1939. He served again, this time in the Home Guard, from 1940 to 1944.  He was Church Warden of the Royston Priory Church for many years and a devout churchman. He died in May 1955 and is remembered by the memorial to him in the Lady Chapel.

Sir Gerard Robert Henry Sigismund Newman, 3rd Baronet was born at Burloes Hall in North Hertfordshire on 19 July 1927. He was educated at St Peter's Court; Eton College; and Jesus College, Oxford, where he graduated in 1951 with 2.1 in Law. He went on to become a director and Chairman of several manufacturing companies, the most notable being Rom River based in Battersea and Galloway Group based in Dundee. Rom River was purchased in the early 1950s which he built up very successfully with his brother, John Newman until it was purchased by Blue Circle Cement in 1969. He acquired land at Fairhaugh in Northumberland in 1972 and the Oxcombe Estate, Lincolnshire in 1985. He endowed a scholarship at the University of Hertfordshire in Engineering and funded a Charitable Trust in his name. Gerard was made High Sheriff of Hertfordshire in 1981. He died on 15 August 1987 leaving a notable collection of art including picture by Canaletto, Guardi, Van Ruysdael, Van de Capella, Turner and Gainsborough.

Sir Francis Hugh Cecil Newman, 4th Baronet (born 1963) is the current holder of the baronetcy. The heir apparent to the baronetcy is Thomas Ralph Gerard Newman (born 1993), eldest son of Sir Francis Newman.

References

Kidd, Charles, Williamson, David (editors). Debrett's Peerage and Baronetage (1990 edition). New York: St Martin's Press, 1990.

Baronetcies in the Baronetage of the United Kingdom
Extinct baronetcies in the Baronetage of England